Meredith Ann Brooks (born June 12, 1958) is an American singer-songwriter and guitarist. A member of the Oregon music scene since the mid-1970s, she received international acclaim in the 1990s with her solo album Blurring the Edges and its 1997 single, "Bitch", which reached the top 10 in many countries and earned her a Grammy Award nomination.

Career 
Brooks started her music career in 1976 as a member of an all-female band called Sapphire, based in Eugene, Oregon, touring and recording with CMS Records in the Pacific Northwest. Her bandmates were Janis Gaines, Cynthia Larsen, Patricia French and Pam Johnson. Seeking greater success, Brooks pushed the band to move to Seattle without Gaines on keyboards, reducing Sapphire to a foursome. In Seattle, Sapphire recorded at Kaye-Smith Studios at the same time as Heart. When this version of the band split in 1982, Brooks moved to Los Angeles to develop a solo career, releasing an album titled Meredith Brooks in 1986, which saw limited success in Mexico. In 1987, she joined Charlotte Caffey and Gia Ciambotti to form the trio the Graces, releasing the single "Lay Down Your Arms" which rose to number 56 on Billboards charts. The Graces subsequently released an album, Perfect View, and three more singles, but these did not chart, and the Graces were dropped from the A&M label in 1991.

In 1995, Brooks landed a solo contract with Capitol Records. After two years, her first single, "Bitch", was released, and she was nominated twice for the 1998 Grammy Awards, for Best Female Rock Vocal Performance and Best Rock Song. The single went Platinum in Australia.

Her album Blurring the Edges achieved Platinum sales, peaking at 22 on the Billboard 200 and 5 on the UK Albums Chart. The album was produced by David Ricketts, formerly of David and David, and he also played keyboards (among other instruments) on the album. Brooks toured in the US and Europe in 1997 and 1998 to support the album, and also participated in the Lilith Fair music festival tour in both of those years.

On March 29, 1998, in Argentina, she opened for the Rolling Stones. During her set the crowd demanded the Stones and became violent, throwing objects including rocks and tampons at the stage and bruising her eye. She appeared again the next day wearing an Argentine football shirt, but the crowd again threw things at her, so after singing "Bitch" she yelled to the crowd, threw the shirt on the ground and walked off.

In 1999, Brooks recorded her third album, Deconstruction. The track "Sin City" was recorded for the movie Snake Eyes.

In 2002, Brooks signed with independent label Gold Circle Records. She worked on her fourth album, Bad Bad One. The label folded immediately after releasing the album.

In 2002, she produced Jennifer Love Hewitt's album BareNaked and appeared on VH1 Divas Las Vegas as a guest guitar soloist with Celine Dion and Anastacia.

Brooks signed a record deal with SLG Records and re-issued Bad Bad One as Shine in 2004. The track "Shine" was used as the theme music for Dr. Phil from 2004 to 2008. The instrumental remix appears as the last track on the album.

In 2007, Brooks completed a children's album titled If I Could Be... She also began developing Portland-area Sony Music Entertainment artist Becca.

Brooks is a member of the Canadian charity Artists Against Racism.

In 2018, the song "I'm a Mess" was a worldwide chart hit for Bebe Rexha. While an original song, it does borrow some of its melody from Brooks' earlier hit "Bitch". As a result, Meredith Brooks is listed as a co-writer of the song.

Awards and nominations 
{| class=wikitable
|-
! Year !! Awards !! Work !! Category !! Result
|-
| rowspan="6" | 1997
| Billboard Music Video Awards
| rowspan="3" | "Bitch" 
| Best New Artist Clip (Pop/Rock)
| 
|-
| rowspan="2" | MTV VMA
| Best New Artist
| 
|-
| Best Female Video
| 
|-
| MTV EMA
| rowspan="7" | Herself
| Best New Act
| 
|-
| Billboard Music Awards
| Top Hot 100 Artist - Female
| 
|-
| Žebřík Music Awards
| Best International Female
| 
|-
| rowspan="7" | 1998
| Pollstar Concert Industry Awards
| Best New Artist Tour 
| 
|-
| Brit Awards
| Best International Female
| 
|-
| ECHO Awards
| Best International Newcomer
| 
|-
| Blockbuster Entertainment Awards
| Favorite Female - New Artist
| 
|-
| rowspan="2" | Grammy Awards
| rowspan="3" | "Bitch"
| Best Rock Song
| 
|-
| Best Female Rock Vocal Performance
| 
|-
| APRA Awards
| Most Performed Foreign Work
|

Discography

Albums

Extended plays 
 Meredith Brooks: Celebrating Pride (2022)

Singles

References

External links 

 
 Kissing Booth, personal blog
 Meredith Brooks Top 40 Mainstream Page

1958 births
Living people
American women singer-songwriters
APRA Award winners
Singer-songwriters from Oregon
Musicians from Corvallis, Oregon
People from Oregon City, Oregon
Corvallis High School (Oregon) alumni
Guitarists from Oregon
20th-century American women guitarists
20th-century American guitarists
20th-century American women singers
The Graces (band) members
21st-century American women guitarists
21st-century American guitarists
21st-century American women singers
20th-century American singers